Penn State Altoona is a commonwealth campus of The Pennsylvania State University located in Logan Township, Pennsylvania. It is one of four full-fledged four year institutions in the Commonwealth Campus network. The full-time student count was 3,645 in 2015.

History
In 1939, a citizen’s committee led by the Altoona Chamber of Commerce Chairman at the time convinced Ralph D. Hetzel, president of the Pennsylvania State College, to support an undergraduate center in Altoona. In July, the citizen’s committee launched a campaign to raise money to renovate an abandoned grade school building to house the new center. More than $5,000 was raised from 8,000 local contributors in two months. The college opened its doors to just 119 freshmen and nine faculty members.

By 1946, it was clear that the campus population was going to continue to grow and expansion of the campus was imminent. The purchase of the 38 acres of the defunct Ivyside Amusement Park was made for $40,000. The park had been closed in 1944 due to "the war and gas rationing." Properties in the surrounding areas were continued to be purchased totaling over 100 acres by the 1990s. In September 1948, the official relocation was made to Ivyside; this era of the college was dubbed that of "Bathhouse U," a name that referred to the conversion of the former amusement park's bathhouse into "offices, classrooms, laboratories, and [the] library." By 1950, Steven Adler was hired as the Registrar "indicating the enrollment and campus growth was significant enough that someone needed to focus on those issues". In 1955 the college introduced Associate degrees in Electrical Engineering and Drafting and Design. Sixty-eight years later, Penn State Altoona numbers keep growing, with more students graduating each spring.

Penn State Altoona offers internships, research programs and study abroad programs along with continuing education and training. Students can complete their degrees at Penn State Altoona or transfer to another Penn State location.

Student life
Currently there are over 75 student groups on campus, including three fraternities, and one sorority, the Sheetz Fellows Program, the Black Student Union, Christian Student Fellowship, Students About Living the Truth, Psychology Club, etc. The student groups are overseen by the Student Government Association, whose other duties include improvement of campus, student advocacy, and distributing money to groups. Student Life also includes many planned events, speakers and musicians, as well as plenty of student organization run events.

One student activity is the Altoona Film Series. It takes place at 7pm on Sundays at the Devorris Downtown Center.

Athletics
Penn State Altoona teams participate as a member of the National Collegiate Athletic Association's Division III. The Nittany Lions are a member of the Allegheny Mountain Collegiate Conference. Men's sports include baseball, basketball, golf, swimming & diving, soccer, tennis and volleyball; while women's sports include basketball, bowling, golf, swimming & diving, soccer, softball, tennis and volleyball.

Greek life
Currently there are two social fraternities including Alpha Phi Delta, and Sigma Pi as well as one veterans fraternity, Omega Delta Sigma. There is also one sorority: Alpha Sigma Tau.

Housing, Food Services, & Residence Life

Penn State Altoona offers its students on campus housing during the fall and spring semesters (not available in the summer). The rooms in each hall are furnished with two single beds, two desks, two dressers, closet space, cable TV, and a small microwave/refrigerator/freezer. Vending machines and card-operated laundry machines are located in each hall. The lounges generally contain a TV, lounge, and study area. Residence Life Professional staff members are also present in the residence halls in addition to undergraduate Resident Assistants.

Housing options include:
 Oak Hall - Built in 1964, Oak Hall is a traditional residence hall which, along with Maple Hall, houses the majority of first-year students who live on campus. There are two students per room and the halls are coed by wing. There are Resident Assistants, who live on each floor, who serve as student counselors to the residents of the floor.
 Maple Hall - Built in 1970, Maple Hall is a traditional residence hall which, along with Oak Hall, houses the majority of first-year students who live on campus. There are generally two students per room and the halls are coed by wing, on the first floor, while the second floor houses male students and the third floor houses female students. There are Resident Assistants, who live on each floor, who serve as student counselors to the residents of the floor. A professional staff member lives and has office space in the building located directly off of the lobby. 
 Spruce Hall - Built in 1987, Spruce Hall consists of suites: four students share two bedrooms and a private bathroom. Spruce Hall is reserved mostly for sophomores. Residence life staff office space is also located here in addition to housing the graduate assistant for the Residence Life Office.
 Cedar Hall - Built in 1997, Cedar Hall houses 320 students, includes living space for professional residence life staff, office space, and a guest staff/faculty apartment. Cedar Hall consists of suites: four students share two bedrooms and a private bathroom.

There are also several off-campus housing locations, including Nittany Pointe, Wehnwood Court, College Park, and Penn View Apartments.

In addition to housing on campus, there is a cafe on campus called 'Port Sky Cafe' which serves food from hamburgers and French fries to more varied foods, a coffee shop called 'Coasters Coffee Bar' located in the Hawthorn Classroom Building, and 'Common Grounds', a convenience store available to students, faculty, and staff located in the Slep Student Center building. Common Grounds was originally a coffee shop (the name was a pun on coffee grounds) but closed a year after Coasters opened in the Hawthorn building and became an on-campus convenience store. There are also several fast food restaurants within a mile radius of the campus. The campus is located less than two miles from downtown Altoona.

Information Technology 
Penn State Altoona's Office of Information Technology offers support to students on many technologies such as wireless connection, e-mail, Canvas, etc.   There are also extra resources given to students to help with their academic career such as: computer labs around campus, printing, cloud storage, etc. There are also additional resources and benefits offered through Penn State University as a whole.

References

External links

Official website

 
Educational institutions established in 1939
Universities and colleges in Blair County, Pennsylvania
Altoona, Pennsylvania
1939 establishments in Pennsylvania
Altoona